Henryk Janiszewski (born February 20, 1949) is a former Polish ice hockey player. He played for the Poland men's national ice hockey team at 1980 Winter Olympics in Lake Placid.

References

1949 births
Living people
Ice hockey players at the 1980 Winter Olympics
Olympic ice hockey players of Poland
Polish ice hockey defencemen
Sportspeople from Katowice
20th-century Polish people
21st-century Polish people